Eine kleine Nachtmusik is a live album released by English heavy metal band Venom in 1986. It contains partial recordings of two different concerts with two different setlists. The title Eine kleine Nachtmusik is German for "A Little Night Music". The title is taken from Mozart's piece of the same name.

Track listing 
All songs written by Anthony Bray, Jeffrey Dunn and Conrad Lant, except tracks 1, 2, 5 and 9 by Dunn and Lant.

All songs written by Anthony Bray, Jeffrey Dunn and Conrad Lant, except tracks 2, 3, 4, 7 and 8 by Dunn and Lant.

Personnel 
Cronos – bass, vocals
Mantas – guitar
Abaddon – drums

References 

Venom (band) albums
1986 live albums
Live thrash metal albums